Kayao is a department or commune of Bazèga Province in central Burkina Faso. Its capital lies at the town of Kayao. According to the 1996 census the department has a total population of 37,615  .

Towns and villages
 KayaoDapouryDoundouniGoumsinIlyallaKilouKinkirouKossilciKossoghinKoukoulouLadoPinghinPoaRellouSancé 
SondréSingdinTim-TimYadaYallo-GouroungouYellouYéaoangaGomoghoGoumsa

References

Departments of Burkina Faso
Bazèga Province